Beardsley Creek is a stream in the U.S. state of New York. It is a tributary to Marsh Creek.

Beardsley Creek was named after Levi Beardsley, who settled the area in the 1820s.

References

Rivers of New York (state)
Rivers of Orleans County, New York